Arthur George Baxter (28 December 1911 – 5 September 1944) was a Scottish professional footballer who played as an inside forward in the Scottish Football League for Falkirk and Dundee and in the Football League for Barnsley.

Personal life
Baxter served as a private in the London Scottish of the Gordon Highlanders during the Second World War. He was killed during the Battle of Rimini on 5 September 1944 and was buried at the Gradara War Cemetery.

Career statistics

References

1911 births
1944 deaths
Footballers from Dundee
Association football inside forwards
Scottish footballers
Scottish Junior Football Association players
Scottish Football League players
English Football League players
Dundee North End F.C. players
Portsmouth F.C. players
Falkirk F.C. players
Dundee F.C. players
Barnsley F.C. players
Dundee United F.C. wartime guest players
Aberdeen F.C. wartime guest players
Charlton Athletic F.C. wartime guest players
London Scottish soldiers
British Army personnel killed in World War II
Military personnel from Dundee